Vanocur is a surname. Notable people with the surname include:

Chris Vanocur, American television journalist
Sander Vanocur (1928–2019), American journalist